The canvasback (Aythya valisineria) is a species of diving duck, the largest found in North America.

Taxonomy
Scottish-American naturalist Alexander Wilson described the canvasback in 1814. The genus name is derived from Greek aithuia, an unidentified seabird mentioned by authors, including Hesychius and Aristotle.
The species name valisineria comes from the wild celery Vallisneria americana, whose winter buds and rhizomes are the canvasback's preferred food during the nonbreeding period. The celery genus is itself named for seventeenth century Italian botanist Antonio Vallisneri.

The duck's common name is based on early European inhabitants of North America's assertion that its back was a canvas-like color. In other languages it is just a white-backed duck; for example in French, morillon à dos blanc, or Spanish, pato lomo blanco. In Mexico it is called pato coacoxtle.

Description
It is the largest species in the genus Aythya, being similar in size to a mallard but with a heavier and more compact build than it. 191 males wintering in western New York averaged  and 54 females there averaged . The canvasback has a distinctive wedge-shaped head and long graceful neck. The adult male (drake) has a black bill, a chestnut red head and neck, a black breast, a grayish back, black rump, and a blackish brown tail. The drake's sides, back, and belly are white with fine vermiculation resembling the weave of a canvas, which gave rise to the bird's common name. The bill is blackish and the legs and feet are bluish-gray. The iris is bright red in the spring, but duller in the winter. The adult female (hen) also has a black bill, a light brown head and neck, grading into a darker brown chest and foreback. The sides, flanks, and back are grayish brown. The bill is blackish and the legs and feet are bluish-gray. Its sloping profile distinguishes it from other ducks.

Breeding
The breeding habitat of the canvasback is in North American prairie potholes. The bulky nest is built from vegetation in a marsh and lined with down. Loss of nesting habitat has caused populations to decline. The canvasback usually takes a new mate each year, pairing in late winter on ocean bays. It prefers to nest over water on permanent prairie marshes surrounded by emergent vegetation, such as cattails and bulrushes, which provide protective cover. Other important breeding areas are the subarctic river deltas in Saskatchewan and the interior of Alaska.

It has a clutch size of approximately 5–11 eggs, which are greenish drab. The chicks are covered in down at hatching and able to leave the nest soon after. The canvasback sometimes lays its eggs in other canvasback nests and redheads often parasitize canvasback nests.

Migration
The canvasback migrates through the Mississippi Flyway to wintering grounds in the mid-Atlantic United States and the Lower Mississippi Alluvial Valley (LMAV), or the Pacific Flyway to wintering grounds along the coast of California. Historically, the Chesapeake Bay wintered the majority of canvasbacks, but with the recent loss of submerged aquatic vegetation (SAV) in the bay, their range has shifted south towards the LMAV. Brackish estuarine bays and marshes with abundant submergent vegetation and invertebrates are ideal wintering habitat for canvasbacks. A small number of birds are also known to have crossed the Atlantic, with several sightings being recorded in the United Kingdom. In December 1996, a canvasback was observed in a quarry in Kent, which was followed by an additional sighting in Norfolk in January 1997. At least five more sightings have since been confirmed in England.

Diet

The canvasback feeds mainly by diving, sometimes dabbling, mostly eating seeds, buds, leaves, tubers, roots, snails, and insect larvae. Besides its namesake, wild celery, the canvasback shows a preference for the tubers of sago pondweed, which can make up 100% of its diet at times. The canvasback has large webbed feet adapted for diving and its bill helps it dig tubers from the substrate. In the late 1930s, studies showed that four-fifths of the food eaten by canvasbacks was plant material. 

In the early 1950s it was estimated that there were 225,000 canvasbacks wintering in the Chesapeake Bay; this represented one-half of the entire North American population. By 1985, there were only 50,000 ducks wintering there, or one-tenth of the population. Canvasbacks were extensively hunted around the start of the 20th century, but federal hunting regulations now restrict their harvest, so hunting is ruled out as a cause for the decline. Scientists have now concluded that the decline in duck populations was due to the decline in SAV acreage. Today the population has stabilized and is even increasing slightly, although it is nowhere near previous levels. Studies have now shown that by the 1970s four-fifths of the ducks' diet was made up of Baltic Clams, which are very common in the Chesapeake Bay: the ducks have been able to adapt to the decline in SAV by changing their diet. Redheads, which also feed on SAV tubers, have not been able to adapt, and their population remains low. Canvasbacks are omnivores, eating everything from seeds to plant tubers and from mussels to insects. During the breeding season they eat both plant and animal foods, but during migration and winter they primarily eat rhizomes and tubers from aquatic plants. Canvasbacks dive straight down to depths of around 7 feet to extract pieces of aquatic plants with their bill. Other food is taken from or just below the surface of the water.

Cuisine

Canvasback ducks were a particularly prestigious game dish in mid-19th-century America. They were rarely found on everyday menus, and often featured at banquets. They were generally sourced from Maryland and Chesapeake Bay, and their flavor was attributed to their diet of wild celery. By the end of the century, though, they had become "scarce, expensive, or unobtainable".

Edith Wharton refers to canvasback  with  blackcurrant sauce as an especially luxurious dinner served in New York City  in the 1870s. Canvasback duck was a canonical element, along with Terrapin à la Maryland, of the elegant "Maryland Feast" menu, an "elite standard... that lasted for decades".

Conservation
Populations have fluctuated widely. Low levels in the 1980s put the canvasback on lists of special concern, but numbers increased greatly in the 1990s. The canvasback is particularly vulnerable to drought and wetland drainage on the prairies of North America.

Many species of ducks, including the canvasback, are highly migratory, but are effectively conserved by protecting the places where they nest, even though they may be hunted away from their breeding grounds. Protecting key feeding and breeding grounds is key for conserving many types of migratory birds.

References

External links

 Canvasback - Aythya valisineria - USGS Patuxent Bird Identification InfoCenter
 
 
 
 

Aythya
Native birds of Alaska
Native birds of Western Canada
Native birds of the Canadian Prairies
Native birds of the Northwestern United States
Birds described in 1814
Taxa named by Alexander Wilson (ornithologist)
Extant Pleistocene first appearances